Alouette or alouettes may refer to:

Music and literature
 "Alouette" (song), a French-language children's song
 Alouette, a character in The King of Braves GaoGaiGar

Aerospace
 SNCASE Alouette, a utility helicopter developed in France in the early 1950s which was abandoned for development of the Alouette II
 Aérospatiale Alouette, a family of light helicopters manufactured by SNCASE
 Aérospatiale Alouette II, a light utility helicopter built in France (1956–1975)
 Aérospatiale Alouette III, a light utility helicopter built in France (1961–1985)
 No. 425 Squadron RCAF, also known as Alouette Squadron and now called 425 Tactical Fighter Squadron, a squadron of CF-18 based out of Bagotville, Quebec
 Alouette 1, a Canadian satellite launched in 1962
 Alouette 2, a Canadian satellite launched in 1965

Sport
 Montreal Alouettes, a team in the Canadian Football League
 Notre-Dame-de-Grace Maple Leafs, also called the Montreal Junior Alouettes, a team in the Quebec Junior Football League
 Nipissing Alouettes, an ice hockey team
 Saint-Jérôme Alouettes, an ice hockey team

Places
 Alouette Lake, a lake in British Columbia, Canada
 Alouette River, a river in British Columbia, Canada
 9995 Alouette, an S-type main-belt asteroid

Other uses
 Alouette (train), a former passenger train between Boston, US and Montreal, Canada
 Alouette (cheese), an American French-style cheese
 Aluminerie Alouette, an aluminum smelter located at Sept-Îles, Quebec
 Legio V Alaudae, or the Fifth Larks Legion, a legion levied by Julius Caesar in 52 BC

See also
 Lark (French: Alouette), a bird
 "Promise This" (2010), a song by Cheryl